The Waverly Street Bridge, also called the Westernport Bowstring Arch Truss Bridge, was a historic steel bowstring truss bridge at Westernport, Allegany County, Maryland, United States. It carried vehicular traffic on Waverly Street over George's Creek. It was built in 1892, by the King Bridge Company of Cleveland, Ohio.

The Waverly Street Bridge was listed on the National Register of Historic Places in 1984.  It was demolished in 1991.

See also
List of bridges documented by the Historic American Engineering Record in Maryland
List of bridges on the National Register of Historic Places in Maryland

References

External links
, including undated photo, at Maryland Historical Trust

Transportation buildings and structures in Allegany County, Maryland
Road bridges on the National Register of Historic Places in Maryland
Bowstring truss bridges in the United States
King Bridge Company
Historic American Engineering Record in Maryland
National Register of Historic Places in Allegany County, Maryland
1892 establishments in Maryland
Bridges completed in 1892
Steel bridges in the United States
Buildings and structures demolished in 1991
Demolished buildings and structures in Maryland